Gahuiyeh may refer to:
 Gahuiyeh, Baft
 Gahuiyeh, Kerman